Donald McAuley (25 April 1867 – 27 January 1912) was a Barbadian cricketer. He played in nineteen first-class matches for the Barbados cricket team from 1887 to 1898.

See also
 List of Barbadian representative cricketers

References

External links
 

1867 births
1912 deaths
Barbadian cricketers
Barbados cricketers
People from Saint Michael, Barbados